The Dizzy Limit is a 1930 British comedy film directed by Edward Dryhurst and starring Jasper Maskelyne, Joy Windsor and Wallace Bosco. It was initially a silent film but was reissued with sound added. It concerns a travelling theatre troupe.

According to Jasper Maskelyne, The Dizzy Limit was the last silent film made in the United Kingdom.

Cast
 Jasper Maskelyne - Jasper Montague
 Joy Windsor - June
 Wallace Bosco - Woolf
 Dino Galvani - Pierpoint
 George Wilson - Gus
 Ian Wilson - Callboy

References

External links

1930 films
1930 comedy films
British silent feature films
Films directed by Edward Dryhurst
British comedy films
British black-and-white films
1930s British films
Silent comedy films